Tropical Storm Henri was a moderate tropical storm that formed in the 2003 Atlantic hurricane season. The eighth storm of the season, Henri was one of six tropical cyclones to hit the United States in the year. Henri formed from a tropical wave in the Gulf of Mexico in early September, and crossed over Florida as a tropical depression. Its remnants later moved into the Mid-Atlantic before dissipating completely.

Henri caused little damage as a tropical cyclone. In Florida, it dropped heavy rainfall, though damage was limited to minor flooding damage. In Delaware and Pennsylvania, damage was greater, where heavy rainfall damaged hundreds of houses and businesses. The resulting floods in Delaware were described as a 1 in 500 year event. The total damage by Henri along its path amounted to $19.6 million (2003 USD, $21.5 million 2006 USD), but no deaths were reported.

Meteorological history 

On August 22, a tropical wave moved off the coast of Africa, and it moved westward across the Atlantic Ocean and Caribbean Sea without developing significantly. On September 1 the wave axis entered the Gulf of Mexico, and upon doing so convection steadily organized around a low-level center of circulation. The system moved northward and developed into Tropical Depression Twelve on September 3 while located about 300 miles (480 kilometers) west of Tampa, Florida. Embedded within a slow mid-latitude trough, the depression moved eastward and strengthened into Tropical Storm Henri on September 5.

Despite strong southwesterly vertical shear, Henri continued intensifying while moving eastward, and reached a peak strength of  later on September 5. Shortly thereafter, though, the shear greatly weakened the storm, and it was downgraded to a tropical depression. Henri was not able to recover its intensity, and made landfall near Clearwater, Florida on September 6 as a  tropical depression, and quickly crossed the state as it accelerated to the northeast. Despite initial predictions of re-intensification over open waters due to potentially lower shear, Henri failed to re-strengthen and degenerated into a remnant low pressure area on September 8 off the coast of North Carolina.

The broad and disorganized remnant low remained nearly stationary due to a ridge of high pressure to its north. Residual convection within the remnants of Henri remained disorganized, but forecasters kept watch for the potential for redevelopment. However, it moved inland near Cape Hatteras on September 12 without reorganizing. The remnants continued to the north and dissipated on September 17 over New England.

Preparations 
The National Hurricane Center issued a Tropical Storm Warning from Englewood to Indian Pass, Florida while Henri was a tropical depression; however, warnings were discontinued by the time Henri made landfall. As a result of the storm's approach, twelve shelters were placed on standby. Similarly, the Hurricane Shelter Information Hotline was placed on standby and ready to be activated within 10 minutes. Levy County officials declared a state of emergency. There, sand bags and sand were sent to Cedar Key, Yankeetown, and Inglis in anticipation for storm surge and flooding.

Impact

Florida, Bahamas, and Bermuda 
Before making landfall, the storm produced strong waves on the Florida west coast. It caused a rapid flooding of roads, though quickly retreated. Damage was minor, due to lack of many homes in the area. A feeder band in Charlotte County dropped  of rain in three hours, flooding numerous streets and homes. Throughout Florida, damage was minimal, and there were no deaths. However, lightning from a feeder band injured a man in Lee County, while an indirect injury occurred from a car crash due to hydroplaning.

This hindered cleanup efforts, though caused no known damage.

Mid-Atlantic 
The heavy rainfall led to record discharge rates along the Red Clay Creek, which also had a record crest peaking at just below . Parts of the creek saw a 500-year flood, which has a 0.2% chance of occurring in any given year. Numerous rivers in southeastern Pennsylvania also crested above their flood stage.

In Delaware, the flooding damaged numerous houses, including 194 in the Glenville area. The rapid flooding trapped numerous people in their cars and homes, forcing at least one rescue by helicopter. Those people were evacuated to nearby schools. The severe flooding washed out most of a bridge in Hockessin and destroyed 6 Wilmington & Western Railroad bridges, causing about $5 million (2003 USD, $5.5 million 2006 USD) in damage. The railroad bridges were still being rebuilt as of 2006. Greenbank Mill, a historic gristmill complex, saw $450,000 in damage. Damage in Delaware totaled to $16.1 million (2003 USD, $17.5 million 2006 USD).

Flash flooding in Pennsylvania resulted in 2,600 emergency 911 calls and around 100 rescues for cars or houses. The flooding destroyed 12 homes, and damaged 336, over half of them severely. Wet soil downed trees and power lines, causing power outages to 109,000 PECO Energy customers. High floodwaters damaged 22 bridges and closed 2 indefinitely, while the flooding closed several roads, including a portion of U.S. Route 1 in Chadds Ford. Damage in Pennsylvania totaled to $3.5 million (2003 USD, $3.8 million 2006 USD).

Aftermath 
On September 23, just days after the storm moved through, President George W. Bush declared New Castle County, Delaware as a disaster area following the effects of Henri and later Hurricane Isabel. The declaration designated the affected citizens eligible for grants to pay for temporary housing, house repairs, and serious disaster-related expenses. The declaration also allowed for federal funding for 75% of the repair cost for replacing public facilities. By two months after the storm, 659 residents had applied for disaster aid through the Federal Emergency Management Agency (FEMA), totaling to just over $1 million (2003 USD, $1.1 million 2006 USD). 141 small businesses applied for loans, totaling to around $2.5 million (2003 USD, $2.75 million 2006 USD). In addition, FEMA received 183 applications for public assistance, which would be used for rebuilding public roads and buildings. Over twenty volunteer organizations met to establish a long-term committee to find resources for disaster recovery needs. One goal sought by the committee was to find a permanent housing solution for every one who was displaced from their houses from the storms. Volunteers also helped remove ruined appliances and furniture to local landfills, totaling to more than 300 tons. State and county governments in Delaware purchased 171 homes following the damage in the Glenville area, the highest number of houses purchased in the state due to storm damage. The house purchasing was done to mitigate the flood damage by restoring the area as a wetland.

On September 26, President Bush also declared Chester County, Pennsylvania as a disaster area following the damage of Henri, Tropical Storm Isabel, and severe flooding unrelated to either tropical cyclone. By a month after the declaration, 342 homeowners and business owners applied for disaster aid, totaling to around $600,000 (2003 USD, $660,000 2006 USD).

See also 

 Other storms of the same name
 List of Atlantic hurricanes
 Timeline of the 2003 Atlantic hurricane season
 List of Florida hurricanes (2000–present)
 List of New Jersey hurricanes

References 

2003 Atlantic hurricane season
2003 natural disasters in the United States
Atlantic tropical storms
Hurricanes in Florida
Hurricanes in Delaware
Hurricanes in Pennsylvania
Hurricanes in North Carolina
Hurricanes in New Jersey
Henri